The 2020 Sánchez-Casal Cup was a professional tennis tournament played on clay courts. It was the third edition of the tournament which was part of the 2020 ATP Challenger Tour. It took place in Barcelona, Spain between 5 and 11 October 2020.

Singles main-draw entrants

Seeds

 1 Rankings are as of 28 September 2020.

Other entrants
The following players received wildcards into the singles main draw:
  Carlos Gimeno Valero
  Nicola Kuhn
  Ramkumar Ramanathan

The following player received entry into the singles main draw using a protected ranking:
  Maximilian Marterer

The following players received entry into the singles main draw as special exempts:
  Francisco Cerúndolo
  Blaž Kavčič

The following players received entry from the qualifying draw:
  Marcelo Tomás Barrios Vera
  Andrea Collarini
  Enzo Couacaud
  Brandon Nakashima

The following players received entry as lucky losers:
  Maxime Janvier
  Renzo Olivo
  Peter Polansky

Champions

Singles

  Carlos Alcaraz def.  Damir Džumhur 4–6, 6–2, 6–1.

Doubles

  Szymon Walków /  Tristan-Samuel Weissborn def.  Harri Heliövaara /  Alex Lawson 6–1, 4–6, [10–8].

References

Sánchez-Casal Cup
2020 in Spanish sport
October 2020 sports events in Spain